is a Japanese actress and singer. She hails from Naha City in Okinawa, Japan and currently works for Vision Factory. In 2014, she married actor Osamu Mukai.

Filmography

Television

LxIxVxE (1999)
Kokusan Hina Musume (1999)
Warui Onion episode: "Player" (1999)
Shin-D episode: "Natsu no tsubomi" (2000)
Summer Snow (2000)
Churasan series
Churasan (2001)
Churasan 2 (2003)
Churasan 3 (2004)
Churasan 4 (2007)
Kinyou jidai-geki episode: "Goban no tsubaki" (2001)
Kinyou drama episode: "Yume no California" (2002)
Doyou grand gekijo episode: "Tantei Kazoku" (2002)
Tensai Yanagizawa kyouju no seikatsu (2002)
Kinyou drama episode: "Black Jack no yoroshiku ~Say hello to BLACK JACK~" (2003)
Shin Tele Asa tanjou kinen special drama episode: "Nama housou wa tomaranai!" (2003)
Premium stage tokubetsu kikaku episode: "Taikou ki ~saru to yobareta otoko~" (2003)
Shinshun drama tokubetsu kikaku episode: "Black Jack no yoroshiku ~namida no gan byoutou-hen" (2004)
Kinyou entertainment dai 48 kai Edogawa ranboushou jushou saku episode: "Hirobi no monogram" (2004)
Minna no mukashi wa kodomo datta (2005)
Suiyou premium drama special episode: "Edomae sushi shokunin Kirara no shigoto" (2005)
Koi no kara sawagi drama special episode: "Warawareru onna" (2005)
Brother Beat (2005)
SMAP×SMAP episode: "Happy Valentine ~ano hi no omoi~" (2006)
Drama Complex episode: "Senka ~Ginza hostess kabu battle~" (2006)
Kekkon dekinai otoko (2006)
Chibi Maruko-chan (2006)
Hoshi hitotsu no yoru (2007)
Hotaru no Hikari (2007)
ROMES (2009)
Hungry! (2012)
Date – Koi to wa Donna Mono Kashira (2015)
Hikaru Kimi e (2024), Chiyaha

Movies
Mirror wo Fuku Otoko (2004)
Densha Otoko (2005)
My Darling Is a Foreigner (2010)

Discography

Single
Ryukyu Moon (2003)
Meguri aeta ne (2004)

Album
Furusato (2004)

DVD
Oto keshiki (2004)

References

External links

Ryoko Kuninaka at the Japanese Movie Database (Japanese)

1979 births
Living people
People from Naha
Japanese actresses
Ryukyuan people
Asadora lead actors